Guerra Grande can refer to:
Uruguayan Civil War from 1839 to 1851
Paraguayan War from 1864 to 1870
Ten Years' War in Cuba, from 1868 to 1878